The Garfield Hills are a mountain range in Mineral County, Nevada, in the Great Basin.

References 

Mountain ranges of Nevada
Mountain ranges of the Great Basin
Mountain ranges of Mineral County, Nevada